Carme Torras Genís (born 4 July 1956) is a Spanish computer scientist who has contributed to research on robotics and artificial intelligence. A member of Academia Europaea since 2010, she writes technical works in English and fiction in Catalan.

Biography
Torras studied mathematics at the University of Barcelona (master's 1978) and computer science at the University of Massachusetts (master's 1981). She also earned a Ph.D. in computer science from the Polytechnic University of Catalonia in 1984. Since 1991, she has been a research professor at the Spanish National Research Council.

On the literary front, in addition to her scientific works, Torras has written fiction. For her novel Pedres de toc she was awarded the Premio Primera Columna while her La mutació sentimental (2008), won the Premio Manuel de Pedrolo for science-fiction literature. In 2012, she published Miracles perversos.

Selected publications

Awards
2000: Narcis Monturiol Medal for scientific accomplishments
2007: Fellow of the European Coordinating Committee for Artificial Intelligence
2010: Member of the Academia Europaea
2013: Member of the Royal Academy of Sciences and Arts of Barcelona

References

External links
Carme Torras: Brief CV

1956 births
Living people
Spanish computer scientists
Spanish women computer scientists
21st-century women scientists
Members of Academia Europaea
Writers from Catalonia
People from Barcelona
21st-century Spanish women writers